Outsiders (formerly titled No Running) is a 2022 American-Australian mystery science fiction thriller film written by Tucker Morgan, directed by Delmar Washington and starring Skylan Brooks, Shane West, Bill Engvall and Taryn Manning.

Cast
Skylan Brooks as Jaylen Brown
Rutina Wesley as Ramila
Shane West as Sheriff O'Hare
Diamond White as Simone
Hart Denton as Trevor
Clark Backo as Amira
Bill Engvall as Tim
Taryn Manning

Release
In January 2022, it was announced that the North American distribution rights to the film were acquired by Vertical Entertainment.  The film was released on March 11, 2022.

Reception
The film has a 36% rating on Rotten Tomatoes based on 11 reviews.  Bobby LePire of Film Threat rated the film a 7.5 out of 10.

References

External links